Bangladeshi Canadians are Canadian citizens of Bangladeshi descent, first-generation Bangladeshi immigrants, or descendants of Bangladeshis who immigrated to Canada. The term may also refer to people who hold dual Bangladeshi and Canadian citizenship.

Demographics
While there are no recent official data, however according to the Statistics Canada (2020) there are 100,000 Bangladeshi origin Canadians. Some references show fewer of Bangladesh origin in Canada. The unofficial number of Bangladeshi Canadians as of 2016 is anywhere from 50,000 to 100,000. , more than 28,000 Bangladeshis lived in the city of Toronto, according to Statistics Canada. Most of the Bangladeshi population is concentrated in the Greater Toronto area

Over 100,000 new permanent residents from Bangladesh landed in Canada.

Notable Bangladeshi-Canadians
 Fahd Ananta, internet entrepreneur and co-founder of Tab Payments and Google Chrome extension Chime
 Doly Begum, Member of Provincial Parliament for Ontario
 Amit Chakma, 10th president of University of Western Ontario
 Neamat Imam, writer
 Mizan Rahman, mathematician and writer
 Shamit Shome, soccer player
 Rafiqul Islam, proposer of International Mother Language Day on 21 February
 Surendra Kumar Sinha, 21st Chief Justice of Bangladesh.

See also 

 Asian Canadians
 Bangladesh–Canada relations
 Islam in Canada
 South Asian Canadians
 Begum Para, Canada

References 

Bangladeshi
Asian Canadian
 
 
South Asian Canadian
Bangladeshi diaspora by country